Acalyptris lascuevella is a moth of the family Nepticulidae. It is probably widely distributed in subtropical and tropical regions of Central America. Currently, it is known from Belize (the Maya Mountains) and Mexico (the Pacific Coast in the Oaxaca region).

The habitat consists of secondary and tropical forests.

The wingspan is about 3.4 mm. Adults are on wing from November to December in Mexico and in April in Belize.

External links
Taxonomic checklist of Nepticulidae of Mexico, with the description of three new species from the Pacific Coast (Insecta, Lepidoptera)

Nepticulidae
Moths of North America
Moths described in 2000